The 34th Canadian Parliament was in session from December 12, 1988, until September 8, 1993.  The membership was set by the 1988 federal election on November 21, 1988, and it changed only somewhat due to resignations and by-elections until it was dissolved prior to the 1993 election.

It was controlled by a Progressive Conservative Party majority, led first by Prime Minister Brian Mulroney and the 24th Canadian Ministry, and then Prime Minister Kim Campbell and the 25th Canadian Ministry.  The official opposition was the Liberal Party, led first by John Turner, and after 1990, by Jean Chrétien.

The speaker of the House of Commons was John Allen Fraser.  See also list of Canadian electoral districts 1987-1997 for a list of the ridings in this parliament.

There were three sessions of the 34th Parliament:

Party standings

The party standings as of the election and as of dissolution were as follows:

* After dissolution but before turning over power to Kim Campbell, Brian Mulroney filled all Senate vacancies with Progressive Conservative members, for a total caucus of 58.
** There was one Reform senator in the middle of the 34th Parliament.
*** In the middle of the 34th Parliament, Brian Mulroney used a little-known clause in the constitution to fill the Senate above its normal seat limit by eight, to 112.

Members of the House of Commons
Members of the House of Commons in the 34th parliament arranged by province.

Newfoundland

Prince Edward Island

Nova Scotia

¥ Pat Nowlan quit the Tory party on October 24, 1990, to protest against the introduction of the Goods and Services Tax. He sat as an "Independent Conservative" for the remainder of the parliament.

New Brunswick

* When Jean Chrétien was elected Liberal leader in 1990, Fernand Robichaud stepped aside 24 September 1990 to cause a by-election that would allow Chrétien to enter Parliament. Chrétien was elected in the December 10 by-election.

Quebec

§ Just before the 1993 election, Gilles Bernier left the Tories to sit as an independent
† On May 5, 1990, seven Conservative and two Liberal MPs, led by Lucien Bouchard, left their parties to form the Bloc Québécois
‡ Richard Grisé left Parliament after being sentenced to jail for corruption. He was replaced by Philip Edmonston in a February 12, 1990 by-election.
Ø Jean-Claude Malépart died in office on September 16, 1989. The next year he was replaced by Gilles Duceppe in a by-election.
Δ On June 17, 1993, Denis Pronovost left the PC party to sit as an independent following conviction on criminal charges.

Ontario

 ± Ed Broadbent retired from politics and was replaced by Michael Breaugh on October 13, 1990, after a by-election.

Manitoba

Saskatchewan

Alberta

÷ John Dahmer died on November 26, 1988, after winning election but before being formally sworn in as a Member of Parliament. He was replaced by Deborah Grey in a 13 March 1989 by-election.
¥ Alex Kindy quit the Tory party on May 5, 1993, in protest over the GST. He sat as an Independent for the remainder of the parliament.
≈ David Kilgour quit the Tory party on October 24, 1990, in protest over the GST. He later joined the Liberals. (In 2005, he left the Liberals to sit as an independent.)

British Columbia

Northern Territories

By-elections

References

Succession

 
Canadian parliaments
1988 establishments in Canada
1993 disestablishments in Canada
P
P
P
P
P
P